Seymour Lipkin ( May 14, 1927 – November 16, 2015) was an American concert pianist, conductor, and educator.

Early life and piano career
Lipkin was born in Detroit. At age 11, he entered the Curtis Institute of Music where he studied with David Saperton, Rudolf Serkin and Mieczysław Horszowski At age 17 he served as accompanist to Jascha Heifetz on a USO tour of Europe during World War II. He received his degree in 1947.

In 1948, he won the Rachmaninoff Piano Contest, beating Gary Graffman.

As a soloist, he performed with the New York Philharmonic and the Boston Symphony.

Conducting and teaching

Lipkin studied conducting under Serge Koussevitzky and then apprenticed with George Szell at the Cleveland Orchestra. He served as the Assistant Conductor for the New York Philharmonic. Later he was Music Director for the Joffrey Ballet and then conductor of the Long Island Symphony Orchestra.

He was a member of the faculty at Juilliard and also taught at Curtis, Manhattan School of Music, and the New England Conservatory.

In 1987 he became artistic director of Kneisel Hall in Blue Hill, Maine until his death in 2015.

External links

Final Note Magazine: "In memory of Seymour Lipkin'

References

20th-century classical pianists
American male conductors (music)
1927 births
2015 deaths
American classical pianists
Curtis Institute of Music alumni
Juilliard School faculty
Curtis Institute of Music faculty
20th-century American male musicians